Mercenary is a novel by Piers Anthony published in 1984.

Plot summary
Mercenary is a novel in which Hope Hubris survives the training course of the Jovian Navy before he sets out with a task force to eliminate space piracy.

Reception
Dave Langford reviewed Mercenary for White Dwarf #69, and stated that "Parts of this are quite sensible, but are balanced by dottiness like the space-battle which – for reasons known only to Anthony – echoes the Mongol invasion of Hungary so faithfully as to neglect the fact that space has three dimensions... Amusing nonsense, but definitely nonsense."

Reviews
Review by Mary S. Weinkauf (1984) in Fantasy Review, August 1984

References

1984 science fiction novels
Avon (publisher) books
Bio of a Space Tyrant